Bucculatrix variabilis is a moth in the family Bucculatricidae. It is found in North America, where it has been recorded from California. It was first described in 1910 by Annette Frances Braun.

The larvae feed on Baccharis pilularis.

References

Natural History Museum Lepidoptera generic names catalog

Bucculatricidae
Moths described in 1910
Moths of North America
Taxa named by Annette Frances Braun